A drum major or field commander is the leader of a marching band, drum and bugle corps, or pipe band, usually positioned at the head of the band or corps. The drum major is often dressed in more ornate clothing than the rest of the band or corps and is responsible for providing commands to the ensemble, leading them while marching, and directing them what to play, when to play, the dynamic or volume of playing, and what time to keep. The commands may be given verbally, through hand gestures, using a whistle or a baton, or with a mace.  Although the drum major is the one conducting for the entire band to see and watch to keep time, the drum major is actually looking at the center snare's feet to keep time. The center snare is the leader of the drumline, and is the one who keeps the band in time while marching.  They usually play, tap and/or rolls to set the tempo of how fast the band marches.  

In addition, the drum major serves as the liaison between the band director and the band. Essentially, a drum major is the leader who keeps the tempo with the use of a baton or other forms of time-keeping, such as conducting. The drum major often holds the responsibility to keep the band organized and structured.

History

The position of drum major originated in the British Army with the Corps of Drums in 1650. Military groups performed mostly duty calls and battle signals during that period, and a fife and drum corps, directed by the drum major, would use short pieces to communicate to field units. With the arrival of military concert bands and pipe bands around the 18th century, the position of the drum major was adapted to those ensembles.

Traditionally, a military drum major was responsible for:
Defending the drummers and bandsmen (The drums and bugles were communication devices)
Military discipline of all Corps of Drums members
The Corps of Drums' overall standards of dress and deportment
Corps of Drums administrative work
Maintain the Corps of Drums' standard of military drill and choreograph marching movements

The drum major was also given duties in the battalion at several points in history, which included the administering of military justice (flogging) to any member of the battalion, and collecting the battalion's post.

In addition to the duties above, the British Army also included a royal appointment of Drum Major General, whose duties included inspecting all other Field Music as well as (per The Drummer's Handbook) granting drummers licenses without which, one would not be recognized as a drummer. This position faded in the 18th century.

Roles

Conductor
Drum majors are responsible for knowing the music of the ensemble and conducting it appropriately. While also knowing the tempo the drum major has to know what specific pattern he or she needs to perform in order to accommodate physical stamina or musical style.

Patterns

Drum majors may each have a different style of conducting. Some may be smoother, but others are more rigid. The most commonly used pattern is called the "Down-in-out-up" pattern. The pattern is shown by the first beat being straight down and normal. The second beat goes down then after the focal point it goes in a 45 degree angle to the inside. The third beat is when the arm is coming back from the angle to the focal point at the angle and hits the point and goes to the outside at the same 45 degree angle. The last beat, fourth, goes from the outside angle back to the focal point. Then the process repeats. It is typical for drum majors to use smaller, simpler patterns to accommodate faster tempos for endurance and clarity, emphasizing beats 1 and 3 and minimizing beats 2 and 4.

Controlling tempo
What is "appropriate" conducting has evolved over the decades. During the 1970s and prior it was not uncommon for a stationary drum major to do a high-lift mark time on the podium for an audible and visual tempo; with the arrival of increasingly higher drum major platforms and thus greater visibility this has become both dangerous and unnecessary. Current drum majors use a variety of conducting patterns and styles that suit the needs of their respective marching bands and/or drum corps.

Assisting musicality
In addition to memorizing the music (between six and nine minutes of music is typical for high school marching bands, college bands and drum corps may have that much or more, up to more than eleven minutes of music) a drum major must memorize dynamics as well as tempo in order to provide proper direction and cues, particularly in area where the drum major has some discretion, such as a ritardando or fermata.

Performer
Drum majors have slightly different roles within the world of traditional show bands. Many college bands have drum majors who are very much part of the visual element of a field show. Rather than conduct as a corps-style drum major would, traditional drum majors often march on the field with the band, using a mace or baton to keep time and flourish their own movements. Drum majors in the Big Ten and HBCUs have a particularly prominent role. While most of them do not conduct as much as a corps drum major, they lead the band onto the field, often after having several seconds for a short performance by themselves (a drum major backbend is traditional in many schools). During dance routines, they often move along with the bands. As traditional drum majors have much more of a visual role than corps drum majors, there are often many more of them, sometimes up to ten drum majors to a single band.

Leader
The drum major position is one of leadership, instruction, and group representation, but usually not administrative duties. A band director or corps director assumes administrative responsibility. In the absence of the band director, the drum major often carries the authority of the director or instructor and assumes complete leadership over the band.

Equipment

There are a number of specialized pieces of equipment that drum majors use to more effectively execute their duties. These include a whistle, a mace or baton, their uniform, and podium(s).

Uniform
In British and European tradition, a drum major usually wears the same uniform as the rest of the band with the additional of a diagonal sash.

Drum majors of marching bands in the United States often wear a uniform different from the rest of the band (which may either be a show-specific uniform, or a custom uniform based on the school's uniform or colors) and is a slight modification of the standard uniform. It can be as simple as extra shoulder decorations, a cape, different-colored plumes, or a chain on the helmet, or as complicated as a specialized chest section, and is designed to both help the drum major stand out when coming onto the field and to give distinction to the leader of the band. Some high school drum majors do not wear a different uniform, however, and are recognized by their field or parade position. It is mostly a director's discretion, and is more common only on the high school level.

Mace
Civilian brass bands and pipe bands generally use a mace for giving signals and commands while marching. As marching bands in the United States have started to focus more directly on halftime shows and less on parades, the traditional use of the mace has largely vanished from high school and college marching bands, in preference of hand movements, occasionally with the use of a conductor's baton or whistle.

Podium
When a band is not marching, the drum major may conduct the band from a stage using a baton.

United States marching bands

Drum majors lead bands and drum & bugle corps in the U.S. Drum & bugle corps are predominant in Europe and Japan. The U.S. is the only country where most high schools, colleges, and universities have marching bands and drum majors. The tradition is almost certainly inspired by stirring American march music - brilliant military style musical compositions of John Philip Sousa (1854-1932). Drum majors primarily use whistle and baton or mace commands to cause the band to start marching and/or playing according to the planned performance. This requires timing skills on the field, so that the band starts and finishes on the correct yard lines. As the name implies, the drum major in reality, commands the drum section of the band - whistle commands are heard first, drums sounds ensue, and then music fills the air. It is all very appealing to a crowd of onlookers. The drum major usually wears a more elaborate uniform that is representative of the authority and responsibility of a field commander. A tall hat, such as the busby, is often part of the uniform. The dignified leader of the band captures the minds and hearts of most people, who see a little bit of themselves in the drum major. A marching band show (high school and college) usually begins with a hand salute from the drum major(s). Salutes range in complexity from a simple hand-gesture to complicated routines involving many members of the band. The salute is traditionally the beginning of judging in a competition, and also signals the end of a band's show. A drum major is also responsible for calling the band to attention, beginning, and conducting the show. The drum major may use a whistle, vocal, or hand commands to accomplish this. This practice goes back to the military origins of the marching or field band.

A marching band review (parade) begins like a field show. Because of the street setting, there are usually no change in formations. Scoring is similar to a field show, however there is an added section specifically on the drum major's performance. The drum major is scored based on the execution of the opening routine, salute routine, beating time, vocal, whistle, and hand commands, and overall control of the band.

To see one to three drum majors in most ensembles is typical. In some ensembles, drum majors switch positions during the show to allow all individuals a chance to conduct from the central podium. Occasionally, they may also serve in other capacities such as performing a solo, in which case one or two band directors would conduct the band temporarily until the drum major(s) would finish their/his/her solo.

A marching band or drum corps drum major (field conductor) is in charge of holding the band or corps together, and directing the entire band or corps during shows and competitions. This drum major can come from any section of the performing unit: percussion, winds, or color guard. They are chosen on their musical abilities, leadership qualities, attitude, and passion for the sport. The Drum Major is the highest-ranked band participant, usually followed by the captain(s) of the drumline, then by guard captain(s), pit captain(s) horn sergeant(s), section leaders and band officers.

In military bands, such as the Fightin' Texas Aggie Band or Highty-Tighties, drum majors are senior officers who are responsible for discipline and order of the band off the field, in addition to performance duties. They often command the band as an independent unit even off the playing field, and are treated according to their rank. In these bands, drum majors also march on the field and frequently use maces. Uniforms are in traditional military style; consequently, drum majors are distinguished by rank and unit insignia or distinguishing uniform modifications. For example, a drum major of the aforementioned Aggie Band could be recognized by his prominent wear of a whistle and chain, which is worn with the uniform even when not performing band-related duties. (Similar clothing in other bands may include sashes, unique headwear, or differently colored uniforms.) An example can be seen here.

High school
Based on how large the band is, high school marching bands have anywhere from one to four drum majors who are responsible for conducting and leading the band. Drum majors are often ranked, so that the head drum major occupies the center position during the entire show, or each drum major takes turns as the 'central' drum major by standing on a platform placed on the 50-yard line, while the other two are placed on the 30-yard or 40-yard lines. Any other drum majors are placed on yard lines closer to the end zone, or to the rear of the band for about-turn maneuvers. A member of the on-field band may take a position as drum major temporarily if the band's movements require an additional drum major in the front or back or if the lead drum major performs. Some drum majors serve as leadership positions and can conduct, but prefer to march. These drum majors serve as replacements in case one or more of the permanent drum majors (usually older members of the band) can't make it to a performance, but still continue to practice their conducting abilities. Depending upon the region, field conducting may be done by the band director, allowing the drum major(s) to play a more important role in the performance by marching with the rest of the band.

Selection and auditions
The process of appointing high school drum majors varies based on the school, though it is recognizably up to the director's discretion as to whom to select, which is done typically through an audition process where potential drum major candidates must display their conducting skills, their ability to successfully call and execute commands, and to answer questions that demonstrate what type of leader they are and what they can bring to the band. The director may, in such cases, ask one of the previous marching season's drum majors to join him or her for the auditions to help make a decision as to whom to pick (though such an opportunity is usually brought upon the lead drum major). In addition, the opportunity to be a drum major may not be open to everyone in a band, as a potential candidate may be required to first serve as a section leader, captain, or officer. Alternatively, the opportunity may only be available to band members who are juniors or seniors.

Training
A drum major may be trained in a number of different ways depending on the resources of his or her home program and the drum major's own experience. In many schools, the band director actually refuses to personally teach the drum major conducting and leadership (because it is supposed to be the drum major's job to make that band director's job easier). Most drum majors attend drum major camps to learn to conduct and teach their band. Drum majoring is usually thought of as a leadership responsibility that cannot be taught, and the person selected for the position is ready (or the closest to ready) to take the responsibility. To be a good drum major can never be taught or fully trained to one person.

The George N. Parks Drum Major Academy (DMA) is a nationwide summer camp for high school drum majors. It was founded in 1978 by George N. Parks. The Drum Major Academy is held at various locations around the United States, by 2010 the academy drew up to 3,000 students each year. DMA provides students with marching, conducting, and leadership training in preparation for their upcoming seasons. Parks, considered a national authority on drum majoring, personally led many of these camps until his death in September 2010.

Smith Walbridge Clinics (SWC) has offered a Drum Major Clinic since 1952 and claim to be the nation's first drum major camp. The clinic teaches three styles of drum majoring including traditional, corps, and mace. Other training methods include three levels of conducting, three levels of showmanship, fundamentals of drill design, verbal commands, daily individual evaluations using video tapes, leadership training, score study, teaching and cleaning drill, multi-drum major help, salutes, and mace. The clinic is hosted yearly on the campus of Eastern Illinois University in Charleston, Illinois.

Field competition
Judging and adjudicating
During a field show the drum major is usually evaluated by a different judge than the rest of the band. How the drum major is judged depends on the region and style of the band and personal opinions of the judge themselves. Typical captions for judging a drum major include conducting, communication between drum majors, marching, style, showmanship, and leadership. Judge's comments will often be recorded by a hand held tape recorder and supplied to the drum majors along with the rest of the band's scores and feedback from the competition.

Examples of judge's evaluation sheets:
, 
, 

Award ceremony
If there is an awards ceremony at a marching competition, the drum major(s) usually represent their band and accept any awards. The drum major(s) will usually prepare a separate, shorter salute in order to respectfully accept awards that their band has earned.

In popular culture
Rev. Dr. Martin Luther King Jr. used the role of the drum major to discuss selfishness, consumerism, servitude and love in his famous sermon "The Drum Major Instinct". It has been exploited for education, religion and even advertising.

See also
Conducting
Majorette (dancer)
Marching arts
Marching band
Harch

References
Notes

External links

The Regimental Drum Major Association
Christ's Hospital Band
Doug Brassel's Drum Major Resource
Smith Walbridge Clinics Drum Major
George N. Parks Drum Major Academy
The Drum Major Society
European Drum Major Website
Deutsche Seite der Arbeitsgemeinschaft Drum Major Deutschland
Tom Peacock's Drum Major Competitions
World Drum Major Association
Scottishdrummajor
Drum major in France through the iconography

Marching bands
Drum and bugle corps